Farris is an unincorporated community in Atoka County, Oklahoma, United States. It lies east of the county seat of Atoka on Highway 3 near the county border. From 1914 to 2013, Farris had its own school district with a K-8 school,  but after years of declining enrollment, controversies over the district's management, and an "F" rating from the Oklahoma State Department of Education in December 2012, the district voted to dissolve the school district and join the district in nearby Lane in early 2013. Students above the eighth grade attend Atoka High School in Atoka, some twenty miles west of Farris. 

A post office was established at Farris, Indian Territory on May 17, 1902. It was named for the first postmaster, John L. Farris. At the time of its founding, Farris was located in Jacks Fork County, Choctaw Nation.

References

Unincorporated communities in Atoka County, Oklahoma
Unincorporated communities in Oklahoma